Janelle (Jane Ellen) Kirtley Godfrey (December 8, 1943 - April 28, 2017) was an American former World Champion water skier.

Biography

Janelle was born on December 8, 1943 in Birmingham, Alabama to Robert H Kirtley and Mary Leona Perry Kirtley. With the strict guidance of her parents, she learned how to ski at age 5, and started competing in water skiing tournaments in 1956.  In 1959, at the age of 15, she was on the U.S. Women's National Water Ski Team and competed in Milan, Italy in 1959.  In 1960 she won overall in the Masters Water Ski Tournament, and she went on to win the World Championship in the 1961 World Tournament Women’s Slalom Title and the 1963 Tricks and Slalom. She obtained several Water Skiing National Titles. In 1961 she enrolled in the School of Nursing at St. Vincent's in Birmingham and then graduated in 1964.  In 2001 she was recognized with the Award of Distinction from the Water Ski Hall of Fame, and she was inducted into the Alabama Sports Hall of Fame in 2009.

Personal life
In 1965, Janelle married Roland LeGrand Godfrey, of Adamsville Alabama, and raised three sons in Forestdale and Adamsville Alabama.  Janelle has eight grandchildren and two great-grandchildren.  Her family continued the water skiing tradition and continue to ski in the waters she practiced in on the Black Warrior River in Alabama.  One of her most famous sayings to her family of water skiers is "If you ain't falling you ain't trying".

Tournament results 
 1956 Overall, Slalom, and Tricks National Champion (La Porte, Indiana), Girls Division
 1957 Slalom National Champion (San Diego, CA), Girls Division 
 1959 Slalom and Tricks National Champion and Second Overall (Laconia, New Hampshire), Girls Division 
 1960 Overall and Slalom National Champion (Minneapolis, MN), Girls Division
 1960 Overall Masters Water Ski Tournament Women Division
 1961 Overall and Tricks National Champion (Austin, Texas), Women Division
 1961 World Water Skiing Champions Women Slalom and Women Overall
 1963 Slalom and Tricks National Champion (Long Beach, California), Women Division 
 1964 Slalom National Champion (Webster, Massachusetts), Women Division
 1964 Slalom Masters Water Ski Tournament Women Division

References

1943 births
2017 deaths
American water skiers
Sportspeople from Alabama